Basanthpur Narayan Rao (1 July 1955 – 24 September 2020) was an Indian politician who was a member of the Karnataka Legislative Assembly from Basavakalyan for the Indian National Congress from 2018 until his death. He had competed in the elections to become an MLA twice before winning a seat.

Rao was born on 1 July 1955, in the village of Basanthpur, Bidar district. He was admitted to a private hospital in Manipal on 1 September 2020, for COVID-19 during the COVID-19 pandemic in India. Rao died from the disease on 24 September, aged 65.

Controversies
During 2019 Lok sabha election campaign, Narayana Rao called PM Modi an impotent as he had no children even though he was married. He was criticized for using the stage to make controversial statements.

References

1955 births
2020 deaths
Deaths from the COVID-19 pandemic in India
Indian National Congress politicians from Karnataka
Karnataka MLAs 2018–2023
People from Bidar district